Iranian Science and Culture Hall of Fame or Ever-lasting Names / People (read as čehre-hā-ye māndegār) is a formal ceremony to honor influential contemporary scientific and cultural Eminents. The title is awarded to those who "will remain always alive with its impact on the life of the people of the country". The ceremony is hosted by the IRIB. This foundation has been designed and managed by Dr. Mahmoud  Asadi.

Presenters
The main presenter is IRIB TV4 with collaboration of:
 Academy of Persian Language and Literature 
 Iranian Academy of sciences 
 Iranian Academy of Medical Sciences 
 Iranian Academy of the Arts 
 University of Tehran 
 Sharif University of Technology 
 Iranian Research Institute of Philosophy

Some of the notable members
Majid Samii (1937–, neurosurgery)

Ali Shariatmadari (1924–, educationist)

Sayed Jafar Shahidi (1918–2008, historian of Islam)

Caro Lucas (1951–2010, academician, father of Iranian robotics)

Mahmoud Farshchian (1930–, master of Persian miniature)

Ali Nassirian (1934–, actor)

Mohammad Nouri (1929–2010, singer)

Gholamreza Aavani (1943–, philosopher)

Hashem Rafii-Tabar (1948–, nanotechnologist)

Ali reza Eftekhari (1958-, Vocalist)

Non-Iranians members
Roger Garaudy (1913–2012, French author and philosopher)

Annemarie Schimmel (1922–2003, German Iranologist)

See also
Science in Iran
Culture of Iran

References

Science and technology halls of fame
Halls of fame in Iran
Science and technology in Iran
Iranian Science and Culture Hall of Fame recipients